KECH-FM (95.3 FM) is a radio station broadcasting a classic rock format. Licensed to Sun Valley, Idaho, United States, the station serves the Twin Falls (Sun Valley) area.  The station is currently owned by Richard Mecham, through licensee Woods River Media, LLC.

History
The station was originally assigned the KWRU call sign by the FCC on February 16, 1988; it was to be a not-for-profit community radio station. When funding for the venture failed, it was acquired by Ketchum Radio, which built it out as commercial station KECH-FM and signed it on November 21, 1988. Ketchum Radio was a partnership headed by local resident Chris Haugh, and staff members including Larry Mott, Michael Hess (aka Dallas Dobro), and others, with Gary Stivers handling the news duties. Disc jockeys included Rob Hunter, Sadie Word, and other local talent. The call letters were chosen as a result of a contest, where listeners were asked to pick the call sign for the station. One listener chose KECH (short for the neighboring town of Ketchum). The listener won an all-expenses-paid trip to Belize.

In 1994, Ketchum Radio sold the station to another local operator, Scott Parker's Alpine Broadcasting, Ltd., who owned/operated the station for ten years as its flagship station. Alpine, also based in Ketchum, went on to grow to a-ten station group in other ski-town markets (including Jackson Hole Wyoming, Taos New Mexico and Big Sky & Whitefish Montana). It sold most of its stations to Chaparral Broadcasting, Inc. In 2020, Parker built KHLY in Hailey ID and KSUN in Sun Valley, Idaho — 1440 AM and 103.7 FM.

Chaparral sold KECH-FM and seven other stations to Rich Broadcasting for $3.7 million; the transaction was consummated on April 1, 2013.

Rich Broadcasting sold KECH-FM, three other stations, and a translator to Richard Mecham's Magic Valley Media, LLC effective September 17, 2019 for $475,000.

"KECH-95", (as it is known locally) continues to be the leading station in the Wood River Valley (Blaine County, ID) with local personalities and its service to community affairs.

References

External links
 Official Website

ECH
Classic rock radio stations in the United States
Radio stations established in 1988
1988 establishments in Idaho